Gran Enciclopedia de Andalucía is a Spanish encyclopedia focused in Andalusia region. It has 10 volumes, and it was coordinated by José María Javierre and Manuel Ángel Vázquez Medel.

Junta de Andalucía bought the encyclopedia in 1985.

See also 
 List of encyclopedias by language

References 

Spanish encyclopedias
Andalusian culture